AKB48 Team TP formerly known as TPE48, is a Taiwanese idol group and the sixth international sister group of AKB48, after Indonesia's JKT48, China's SNH48 (former),  Thailand's BNK48, Philippines's MNL48, and China's AKB48 Team SH. The group is named after Taipei, the capital city of Taiwan.

History

2011–2012: Creation 

On October 10, 2011, AKB48 announced the creation of TPE48, and will build the theater next year summer. At that time, AKS cooperated with Yoshimoto Kogyo and expected to start audition work in 2012. However, the two sides failed to reach a consensus in the preparation work, and thus they were discontinued after the second half of 2012.

2014–2015: AKB48 Taiwan Audition 

On December 7, 2014, during HKT48's Taipei concert, AKB48 announced that they will hold an audition for members of the AKB48 in Taiwan someday, but it was unclear whether the audition is related to TPE48. Subsequently, AKB48 officially announced its will hold the "AKB48 Taiwan Audition" on April 1, 2015, which is the first AKB48 audition event held besides Japan. From 2,152 who auditioned, 17 were chosen as member of the "AKB48 Taiwan Kenkyusei"   to have completed the audition on August 17, 2015.

Ma Chia-ling was passed the audition and debuted in December 2015 in AKB48 Kouhaku Utagassen. February 21, 2016, she promoted as the "Taiwan Ryugakusei"  to AKB48 Team B, and becomes first foreign member of AKB48 and the fastest AKB48 member to be promoted.

2016–2017: Resume 
March 26, 2016, the creation of TPE48, BNK48 and MNL48 was announced at the Takahashi Minami's concert.

Later on July 9, 2017, AKB48 announced specially will hold audition for 1st generation members of TPE48 in September during the Kizaki Yuria, Yokoyama Yui and Shimada Haruka's event "AKB48 Fan Meeting in TAIWAN". September 1, TPE48 runs audition and all members of AKB48 Taiwan Kenkyusei were become the seed members in audition. The same day, Abe Maria, a member of AKB48 Team K, says will transfer form AKB48 to TPE48. In the end, on November 30, 2017,  Abe Maria performed the final performance at AKB48 Theater and officially transferred to TPE48 next day.

2018–present 
February 4, 2018, 72 girls were selected for the final round, next 45 girls were revealed for 1st generation members. But at the end, only 40 girls were formally joined into the group, 13 of whom were official members and 27 were trainees.
In 2019, their TTP Festival and 看見夕陽了嗎？(Kan chien hsi yang le ma) rank No.1 and No.4 in Guangnan 2019 yearly chart and No.6 and No.11 in Fivemusic yearly chart.

Financial crisis and group restructure 
On June 16, 2018, TPE48 Entertainment, TPE48's management company, suffered a financial crisis, members and staff didn't get paid about 3 months ago. On July 30, 2018, AKS had canceled a joint venture and license agreement with TPE48 Entertainment and created AKB48 Team TP.

Members 
Member list as of February 19, 2023:

Unit T and Unit P were debuted on January 15, 2023 after Unit Daisy, Unit Bellflower and Unit Sakura disbanded.

The full name of two units Unit TIC TAC TOE and Unit Peek A Boo were announced on February 18, 2023.

Unit TIC TAC TOE 
The unit color is blue (R=60, G=168, B=201)

Unit Peek A Boo 
The unit color is red (R=220, G=72, B=58)

Former members

Captain Change History 
 AKB48 Team TP Captain

 Unit Captain

Discography

Singles

Filmography

Television and radio shows 
Team TP Youth Weekly   (KKBox, March 14, 2019 – present)

Commercials and endorsements 
 Aikatsu! (Sega Amusements Taiwan, 2018–present)
Breeze Nan Shan (Breeze Center, 2019)

References

External links 

  
  

AKB48 Group
Taiwanese girl groups
Japan–Taiwan relations
Musical groups established in 2018
2018 establishments in Taiwan
Musical groups from Taipei